Zakerlu (also Romanized as Z̄ākerlū) is a village in Chaybasar-e Sharqi Rural District, in the Central District of Poldasht County, West Azerbaijan Province, Iran. At the 2006 census, its population was 521, in 103 families.

References 

Populated places in Poldasht County